The 2010 V8 Supercar season was the fourteenth series in which V8 Supercars have contested the senior Australian touring car series. It was the 51st year of touring car racing in Australia since the first runnings of the Australian Touring Car Championship, known today as the V8 Supercar Championship Series, and the fore-runner of the present day Bathurst 1000, the Armstrong 500.

The season began on 18 February at the Yas Marina Circuit in Abu Dhabi and finished on 5 December at the Homebush Street Circuit. 2010 featured the fourteenth V8 Supercar Championship Series, consisting of 14 events covering five states and the Northern Territory of Australia as well as events in the United Arab Emirates, Bahrain and New Zealand. There was also a stand-alone event supporting the 2010 Australian Grand Prix. It also featured the eleventh second-tier Development Series, this year referred to as the Fujitsu V8 Supercar Series. It was a seven-round series. A third third-tier series was run, the Shannons V8 Touring Car National Series. Its five-round series was held on Shannons Nationals Motor Racing Championships events.

Season review
The first title to be decided saw Tony Evangelou dominate Shannons V8 Touring Car National Series, wrapping up the series a round early at Eastern Creek on 12 September.

Steve Owen clinched the Fujitsu V8 Supercar Series with a race to spare, and eventually won the championship by over 300 points, taking four of the seven round victories over the course of the season, and a total of eight race wins. Tim Blanchard finished as season runner-up, taking a round victory at Townsville where he won his only race of the season. Consistent finishing helped James Moffat and Nick Percat – neither won a race – finish in third and fourth places respectively, ahead of David Russell, who won the round at Bathurst. Cameron McConville took the other round win, in a single appearance at Winton, while Taz Douglas, Jack Perkins and Paul Morris each took race victories.

The main V8 Supercar Championship Series was last to be decided, with the championship not being decided until the final race in Homebush on 5 December. James Courtney won his first championship, finishing every race en route to a 65-point title-winning margin over two-time defending champion Jamie Whincup. Courtney's championship was the first for Dick Johnson Racing since John Bowe won the title in 1995. Courtney took five race wins to Whincup's nine, but retirements for the latter at Ipswich and Homebush denied him the opportunity of matching Mark Skaife as a three-time successive champion.
Mark Winterbottom finished third in the championship, winning races at Hidden Valley, Townsville and Symmons Plains, as he finished 60 points over Whincup's team-mate Craig Lowndes. Lowndes won the endurance rounds at Phillip Island and Bathurst with Skaife, as well as a solo win at Symmons Plains. Holden Racing Team's Garth Tander rounded out the top five in the drivers' championship, recovering from a poor beginning to the season, taking a double victory in Adelaide, a win (with Cameron McConville) in Surfers Paradise, as well as a victory in the non-championship BRC IMPCO V8 Supercars GP Challenge for V8 Supercar Championship Series competitors.

Other race victories were taken by Lee Holdsworth, Paul Dumbrell, Jonathon Webb and Steve Owen (partnering Whincup in Surfers Paradise), which were the first victories for each driver with the exception of Holdsworth. Triple Eight Race Engineering won the Teams' Championship via the top four championship placings of Whincup and Lowndes.

Race calendar
Dates sourced from:

 VSC - V8 Supercar Championship Series
 SVTC - Shannons V8 Touring Car Series
 FVS - Fujitsu V8 Supercar Series

V8 Supercar Championship Series

Fujitsu V8 Supercar Series

BRC IMPCO V8 Supercars GP Challenge

Shannons V8 Touring Car National Series

References

External links
 Official V8 Supercar website

Supercar seasons